The Elk River Wind Project is a 150 megawatt wind farm near Beaumont in Butler County, Kansas. The Elk River Project subsidiary is owned by PPM Energy and the project has been operating since 2005.

Empire District Electric selected Elk River, and signed a twenty-year agreement with PPM Energy to purchase wind energy from the farm.

See also 

Smoky Hills Wind Farm

References

External links 

Energy infrastructure completed in 2005
Buildings and structures in Butler County, Kansas
Wind farms in Kansas